The Dagan or Meneao Range languages are a small family of Trans–New Guinea languages spoken in the Meneao Range of the "Bird's Tail" (southeastern peninsula) of New Guinea, the easternmost Papuan languages on the mainland. They are the most divergent of the several small families within the Southeast Papuan branch of Trans–New Guinea.

Languages
The languages are:
 Onjob
 Southwest
 Daga
 Maiwa language, Mapena
 East
 Southeast: Ginuman, Kanasi (Sona)
 Northeast: Dima (Jimajima), Umanakaina (Gwedena), and the nearly extinct Turaka

Although clearly related, they are not particularly close. Umanakaina and Ginuman, for example, are only 23% lexically similar.

Pronouns
Usher (2020) reconstructs the pronouns as:
{| 
! !!sg!!pl
|-
!1
|*n[e/a]||*nu
|-
!2
|*g[e/a]||*j[e/a]
|-
!3
|*me||*mV
|}

Vocabulary comparison
The following basic vocabulary words are from SIL field notes (1965, 1967, 1973), as cited in the Trans-New Guinea database:

{| class="wikitable sortable"
! gloss !! Daga !! Dima !! Maiwa
|-
! head
| iwa || una || kwi'.unwa; kuiyunwa
|-
! hair
| igumewa || deba || gu'mawa; huiawa
|-
! ear
| darinewa || taii(na) || nau'nawa; naunáwa
|-
! eye
| yamewa || yamana || yaŋganwa; yaŋ'ganwa
|-
! nose
| ginewa || giana || ginawa; gi'nunwa
|-
! tooth
| nodonewa || wari(na) || do'nawa; donáwa
|-
! tongue
| mɛriwa || pepa(na) || phed'nawa; pedt nawa
|-
! leg
|  || wana || ai'raniwa; beawa
|-
! louse
| kuisin || igu || kwhi'sin; nagam; usiwa
|-
! dog
| eao || kwegawa || kwhe'.au; kueyao
|-
! pig
| tuan || boro || 'bui
|-
! bird
| nɛnip || midiwari || nenip; ve'khæthu
|-
! egg
| bagua || dodopi || ba'giwa; gat toda; kokorek bagiwa
|-
! blood
| dɛnip || tawayana || di
|-
! bone
| kaemewa || (e)regura || mařɛt'nawa
|-
! skin
| ɛpiwa || etona || koápiwa; pha'phunwa
|-
! breast
| amewa || ama || am
|-
! tree
| oma || na || i; ioma
|-
! man
| apan || apana || apan; a'phan
|-
! woman
| oaen || wawina || ve'sin; wɛsin
|-
! sun
| oam || gabudara || kum; khum
|-
! moon
| siragam || dede || dut; duth
|-
! water
| kaum || oa || ioi; yoi
|-
! fire
| oma || iarema || íam; yaŋ'gawa
|-
! stone
| agim || akima || agim; 'agim
|-
! road, path
| neigin || iyawa || ɛbu; 'ɛbu
|-
! name
| yaoa || ewani || i'vi wa
|-
! eat
| naiwan ||  || mɛ 'nane; naiwi
|-
! one
| daiton || daiida || desi'řoe; désirom
|-
! two
| dɛrɛ || uri || dúam; duːʌm
|}

Evolution
Dagan reflexes of proto-Trans-New Guinea (pTNG) etyma:

Daga language:
ama 'breast' < *amu
meri (nawa) 'tongue' < *me(l,n)e
ira 'tree' < *inda

Kanasi language:
asi 'ear' < *kand(e,i)k(V]
etepa 'bark' < *(ŋg,k)a(nd,t)apu 'skin'
obosa 'wind' < *kumbutu
oman 'stone' < *ka(m,mb)u[CV]
nene 'bird' < *n(e)i

References
Notes

Sources

 

 
Southeast Papuan languages
Languages of Milne Bay Province
Languages of Oro Province